Bent Knee is an American art rock band formed in Boston, Massachusetts, in 2009. The band performs in multiple genres and draws from multiple influences, including pop, industrial rock, progressive rock, and avant-garde. The band is known for unpredictable dynamic contrast and the wide vocal range of singer Courtney Swain.

Bent Knee has toured with The Dillinger Escape Plan, Haken, Leprous, Thank You Scientist, and Mike Keneally. In 2016, they signed to Cuneiform Records for the release of their third album, Say So. In 2017, they signed a deal with Inside Out Music and released their fourth album, Land Animal.

History
Bent Knee was formed at the Berklee College of Music in 2009, when guitarist Ben Levin and vocalist Courtney Swain began writing music together. The band's name is a compound of the founders' names ("Ben" + "[Cour]tney").

The band self-released their first LP, Bent Knee in 2011, then self-released their follow-up, Shiny Eyed Babies in 2014. In late 2015, they were signed to Cuneiform Records, an American independent record label, on which they released Say So in 2016. In April 2017, the band was signed by Inside Out Music for the release of their fourth album, Land Animal, which was released June 23, 2017. Their fifth album, You Know What They Mean, was released in October 2019 also via Inside Out Music. In November 2021, Bent Knee released their sixth album Frosting through Take This To Heart Records.

An early mix of the song "These Hands" from the album Land Animal was featured as free content for Rock Band 4 Rivals in March 2017.

In May 2022, it was announced that Ben Levin and Jessica Kion would be leaving the band.

Members 
Courtney Swain – lead vocals, keyboards
Gavin Wallace-Ailsworth – drums
Chris Baum – violin, backing vocals
Vince Welch – synthesizers, rhythm guitar, sound design, production

Past Members 

Ben Levin – lead guitar, backing vocals (2009-2022)
Jessica Kion – bass guitar, backing vocals (2009-2022)

Discography
Studio albums
 Bent Knee (2011)
 Shiny Eyed Babies (2014)
 Say So (2016)
 Land Animal (2017)
 You Know What They Mean (2019)
 Frosting (2021)

References

Musical groups established in 2009
Musical groups from Boston
Musical groups from Massachusetts
Inside Out Music artists
Cuneiform Records artists

Take This To Heart Records artists